Clover Lick is an unincorporated community in Pocahontas County, West Virginia, United States. The community is home to the Clover Lick Train Depot, which sits along the Greenbrier River Trail at Milepost 71.2. Clover Lick was founded in the early 1900s as a place to board trains traveling along the Greenbrier River.

References

Unincorporated communities in Pocahontas County, West Virginia
Unincorporated communities in West Virginia